Daniella Jeflea (née Dominikovic; born 12 January 1987) is a former Australian tennis player.

Her highest WTA singles ranking is 324th, which she reached on 3 October 2005. In October 2011, she peaked at No. 127 in the doubles rankings.

She is the younger sister of retired player Evie Dominikovic.

ITF Circuit finals

Singles: 2 (1–1)

Doubles: 20 (10–10)

External links
 
 
 CBS Sports statistics

1987 births
Living people
Australian female tennis players
Sportswomen from New South Wales
Australian people of Croatian descent
Tennis players from Sydney